Lee Archer (born 6 November 1972) is an English former professional footballer who played as a midfielder.

Archer was born in Bristol, and began his career as a trainee at his home town club Bristol Rovers. He made 200 appearances for Rovers in all competitions. He was known as a quick left winger or left sided midfielder and was part of a Bristol Rovers side that lost out to Huddersfield at Wembley in the playoff final. Having to give up professional football due to knee injuries he then had a spell at Yeovil Town before moving on to Rushden & Diamonds. He then moved back for a second spell at Yeovil Town. He is now owner of Pro Fitness personal training.

After a long break from the game Lee made a surprise comeback at the age of 37 in August 2010 when he was tempted back by former Bristol Rovers teammate David Mehew to play for Gloucester City as cover for the injured Jake Harris. The Tigers were going through something of an injury crisis and manager Mehew called up his old friend in an effort to patch over some of the gaps in his squad. Although he hadn't played a competitive match at any level for over seven years he impressed on his Gloucester debut; a 5–0 win over Redditch United.

References

External links

1972 births
Living people
English footballers
Association football midfielders
Bristol Rovers F.C. players
Yeovil Town F.C. players
Rushden & Diamonds F.C. players
Gloucester City A.F.C. players
English Football League players
National League (English football) players
Footballers from Bristol